George Washington High School is a public high school in the Somerton section, of Philadelphia, Pennsylvania, near Bustleton. The school serves Northeast Philadelphia, including Somerton, Bustleton, and Fox Chase. Named after the first president of the United States, George Washington, it is located on Bustleton Ave. Washington had an enrollment of 1,875 in 2012.

The school currently has four programs:
  Business and Finance
 Culinary arts (including baking, hospitality administration and management, and travel and tourism)
 International Baccalaureate Program
 Creative and Performing Arts

The school also maintains three career and technology education (CTE) programs:
 Business Technology
 Culinary Arts
 Sports Marketing and Management

History

Beginning on January 8, 2001 there were two fights involving racial issues. Six black students had received criminal charges for ethnic intimidation while the white students had received no charges. The Philadelphia area NAACP chapter's president, J. Whyatt Mondesire, had criticized the lack of charges for the white students.

School uniforms
The school requires its students to wear school uniforms.

For male students, this consists of a jet black or khaki (tan) collared shirt and jet black or khaki (tan) slacks. For female students it is jet black or khaki (tan) collared shirt or blouse and jet black or khaki (tan) slacks or skirt (knee length or longer). The students are also permitted to wear anything with the school's logo or school team/club related wears. This includes gym uniforms, team jackets, team shirts, club shirts, and anything along the line. During the winter, students are also permitted to wear sweater or hoodie of solid black color. Student are not permitted to have hoodies on at any time, nor are any students allowed to wear a hat.

Feeder patterns
Feeder middle schools include Baldi Middle School and General Harry LaBrum Middle School. Feeder K-8 schools include Stephen Decatur School, A. L. Fitzpatrick School, and Joseph Greenberg School. Feeder elementary schools include Anne Frank, Watson T. Comly, Fox Chase, and W. Loesche.

Transportation
SEPTA bus routes  and  serve Washington.

Notable alumni
David Berenbaum, writer, Elf, Zoom, The Haunted Mansion, and The Spiderwick Chronicles
Stephen Costello, Grammy-nominated opera singer (tenor)
Sharrif Floyd, former professional football player, Minnesota Vikings
Danny Garcia, boxer
Barton Gellman, Pulitzer Prize-winning journalist
Kevin Hart, actor and comedian
Dan Master, producer, Little People, Big World, Push Girls, Why Not? with Shania Twain and The Judds
Adam Mazer, writer and Emmy Award winner, You Don't Know Jack
Jameel McClain, former professional football player, Baltimore Ravens and New York Giants 
Scott Mantz, American film critic, writer and producer
Richie Rosenberg, musician
Marc Zumoff: sportscaster
Aaron Wilmer, former professional football player, Canadian Football League

References

External links
Official site

High schools in Philadelphia
School District of Philadelphia
Public high schools in Pennsylvania
1962 establishments in Pennsylvania
Northeast Philadelphia